LIM/homeobox protein Lhx3 is a protein that in humans is encoded by the LHX3 gene.

Function 

LHX3 encodes a protein of a large protein family, members of which carry the LIM domain, a unique cysteine-rich zinc-binding domain. The encoded protein is a transcription factor that is required for pituitary development and motor neuron specification. Two transcript variants encoding distinct isoforms have been identified for this gene.

Clinical significance 

Mutations in this gene have been associated with a syndrome of combined pituitary hormone deficiency and rigid cervical spine.

Interactions
LHX3 has been shown to interact with Ldb1.

References

Further reading

External links 
 

Transcription factors